Marin Čilić was the two-time defending champion, but chose not to participate this year.

Pablo Carreño Busta won the title, defeating Fabio Fognini in the final, 4–6, 6–3, 6–2.

Seeds
The top four seeds receive a bye into the second round.

Draw

Finals

Top half

Bottom half

Qualifying

Seeds

Qualifiers

Lucky losers

Qualifying draw

First qualifier

Second qualifier

Third qualifier

Fourth qualifier

References
 Main Draw
 Qualifying Draw

2016 ATP World Tour
2016 Men's Singles